The Essex County Park System comprises the county-run parks of Essex County, New Jersey. The Essex County Department of Parks, Recreation and Cultural Affairs is in charge of the upkeep and preservation of the parks, reservations and a number of other facilities, including golf courses and trails.

See also 
 Essex County Park Commission Administration Building
 Hudson County Park System

References

External links

County parks departments in the United States
Parks in Essex County, New Jersey
County government agencies in New Jersey